The 1992 FIVB Volleyball Men's Club World Championship was the 4th edition of the event. It was held in Treviso, Italy from 28 to 29 November 1992.

Final standing

Awards
Most Valuable Player
 Lorenzo Bernardi (Sisley Treviso)

External links
Honours

1992 FIVB Men's Club World Championship
FIVB Men's Club World Championship
FIVB Men's Club World Championship
FIVB Volleyball Men's Club World Championship
Sports competitions in Treviso